Totuutta ja tehtävää (in English: Truth and Dare) is the fifth album and the first compilation album by Finnish pop rock singer-songwriter Maija Vilkkumaa. It was released by Warner Music in Finland on 8 November 2006 and peaked at number four on its debut week on the Finnish Albums Chart and charted for 15 weeks. The album has sold 25,620 copies to date in Finland, which has granted it a gold certification.

Track listing
Digital download

Personnel
The credits for Totuutta ja tehtävää are adapted from Fono.fi, a recording database provided by Finnish Broadcasting Company.
 Niko Kokko — arrangement
 Mikko Kosonen — arrangement
 Tero Pennanen — arrangement
 Anssi Pethman — arrangement
 Jan Pethman — arrangement
 Maija Vilkkumaa — vocals, lyrics, composer, arrangement
 Anssi Växby — arrangement

Charts and certifications

Weekly charts

Year-end charts

Certifications

References

2006 compilation albums
Maija Vilkkumaa albums
Finnish-language albums